Geotrupinae is a subfamily of earth-boring scarab beetles in the family Geotrupidae. There are more than 30 genera and 450 described species in Geotrupinae.

Genera
These 31 genera belong to the subfamily Geotrupinae:

 Allotrupes François, 1904
 Anoplotrupes Jekel, 1865
 Ceratophyus Fischer von Waldheim, 1823
 Ceratotrupes Jekel, 1865
 Chelotrupes Jekel, 1866
 Cnemotrupes Jekel, 1866
 Enoplotrupes Lucas, 1869
 Epigeotrupes Bovo & Zunino, 1983
 Geohowdenius Zunino, 1984
 Geotrupes Latreille, 1796
 Geotrupoides Handlirsch, 1906
 Glyptogeotrupes Nikolaev, 1979
 Halffterius Zunino, 1984
 Haplogeotrupes Nikolaev, 1979
 Jekelius Lopez-Colon, 1989
 Lethrus Scopoli, 1777
 Megatrupes Zunino, 1984
 Mycotrupes LeConte, 1866
 Odontotrypes Fairmaire, 1887
 Onthotrupes Howden, 1964
 Peltotrupes Blanchard, 1888
 Phelotrupes Jekel, 1866
 Pseudotrypocopris Mikšic, 1954
 Sericotrupes Zunino, 1984
 Thorectes Mulsant, 1842
 Trypocopris Motschulsky, 1859
 Typhaeus Leach, 1815
 Zuninoeus López-Colón, 1989
 † Cretogeotrupes Nikolajev, 1992
 † Lithogeotrupes Nikolajev, 2008
 † Parageotrupes Nikolajev & Ren, 2010

References

Further reading

External links

 
 

Geotrupidae